Salah Shahrour (born 1 February 1988 in Aleppo, Syria) is a Syrian footballer who plays as a defender for Al-Nejmeh, which competes in the Lebanese Premier League the top division level in Lebanon and is currently a member of the Syria national football team.

Career

Club career
Shahrour's career began in the youth system of Al-Ittihad before starting his professional career with the senior team. He helped the club reach the final of the AFC Cup the second most important association cup in Asia. Al-Ittihad won the final against Kuwaiti Premier League champions Al-Qadsia after penalties. The game was tied 1–1 after regular time and Extra Time.

International career
Shahrour was a part of the Syrian U-20 national team at the 2005 FIFA U-20 World Cup in the Netherlands. He plays against Canada in the group-stage of the FIFA U-20 World Cup and against Brazil in the Round of 16.

He has been a regular for the Syria national football team since 2006.

International goals
Scores and results table. Syria's goal tally first:

|}

Honour and Titles

Club
Al-Ittihad
Syrian Premier League: 2005
Syrian Cup: 2005, 2006, 2011
AFC Cup: 2010

References

External links

1988 births
Living people
Sportspeople from Aleppo
Association football defenders
Syrian footballers
Syria international footballers
Syrian expatriate footballers
Expatriate footballers in Qatar
Syrian expatriate sportspeople in Qatar
Expatriate footballers in Lebanon
Syrian expatriate sportspeople in Lebanon
Al-Ittihad Aleppo players
Footballers at the 2006 Asian Games
Asian Games competitors for Syria
AFC Cup winning players
Nejmeh SC players
Lebanese Premier League players
Syrian Premier League players